Paul T. Mero (born December 2, 1957) works government affairs for Western Governors University (WGU). He is chairman of the board for Transcend Together (formerly Next Generation Freedom Fund (NGFF), a state-based public policy group focused on lifting all Utahns to prosperity. Prior to WGU, Mero was CEO of Leadership Project for America (501c3, c4 and PAC) and, prior to that, president of Sutherland Institute (2000-2014), a conservative public policy think tank based in Salt Lake City, Utah.

Background
Mero was born in the California Bay Area and grew up outside of Washington, D.C. in Fairfax County. He attended Brigham Young University from 1980 to 1984, graduating with a B.A. in Public Policy. While at BYU, Mero co-founded a conservative campus newspaper, The Western Scholar.

From 1987 to 1997, he was employed by the United States Congress, serving two different House members from California. From 1987 to 1993, Mero served as press secretary and legislative assistant to California Republican Congressman William E. Dannemeyer. From 1993 to 1994, he represented the Christian Action Network on Capitol Hill. From 1994 to 1997, Mero served as counselor and then Chief of Staff to California Republican Congressman Robert K. Dornan.

In 1997, Mero left Capitol Hill to found the nonprofit Projects for America, creating SWAN, a social issues database. Projects for America merged in 1998 with the Howard Center for Family, Religion and Society in Rockford, Illinois. Mero served from 1998-2000 as its Executive Vice-President. In 1999, as part of his duties, he coordinated the meeting of the 2nd World Congress of Families in Geneva, Switzerland.

From December 2000 to August 2014, Mero served as president of Sutherland Institute, a conservative think tank based in Salt Lake City, Utah.

From June 2015-June 2016, Mero ran the Leadership Project for America (LPA), a C3, C4 and PAC. LPA promoted leadership, civility and free markets among public officials and published the Leadership Matrix scoring all presidential contenders for the 2016 election (Donald Trump received the lowest score of Republican candidates).

Mero launched Next Generation Freedom Fund (NGFF) in June 2016 wherein he now serves as chairman of the board newly renamed Transcend Together.

Beginning April, 2019 to present, Mero works government relations for Western Governors University (WGU).

Mero has been married to Sally (Sarah Ann Arntson) for 44 years. They have six children and 20 grandchildren currently and reside in Las Vegas, Nevada.

Public activities
Over 35 years, Mero has authored numerous articles, papers, essays and books on culture, law and politics. From 2008 to 2018, Mero had been the voice for the “Mero Moment” on northern Utah radio KVNU, an AM news/talk station. Many of his writings can be found at his personal blog.

In Congress, Mero helped to form the Conservative Action Team (evolving years later, through several iterations, into the now House Freedom Caucus) in the House of Representatives following the 1994 election; worked on social issues such as school prayer, defunding the National Endowment for the Arts, AIDS, the expulsion resolution of Congressman Barney Frank and preventing federal "sex studies" of school children; and, authored the controversial "What Homosexuals Do" remarks inserted into the Congressional Record on June 29, 1989, by Congressman Bill Dannemeyer, as well as authoring Congressman Bob Dornan's 1995 floor speech announcing his presidential run in the 1996 election.

Mero partnered with Allan Carlson of the Howard Center for Family, Religion and Society to publish "The Natural Family: A Manifesto" on the centrality of marriage, family and child-rearing to freedom.

Mero took Sutherland Institute from its infancy to what became the leading conservative voice in Utah. In January 2004, at an event at the Grand America Hotel, Mero reinvented the vision, mission and focus of Sutherland Institute to "transcending politics as usual," co-authoring "The Sutherland Dream" with founder Gaylord Swim and eventually authoring three foundational essays for the Institute: 1) The Sutherland Way: A Call to Responsible Citizens (2010), 2) The Sutherland Plan: The Right Things, The Right Reasons, The Right Way (2012), and 3) The Sutherland Idea: The Cause of Freedom (2013). During Mero's tenure, Sutherland focused on poverty, education, marriage and immigration. Mero was a co-author of the Utah Compact on immigration.

Publications
 Unworthy: An Autobiography of the Imposter https://www.amazon.com/Unworthy-Autobiography-Imposter-Paul-Mero/dp/1718154941/ref=sr_1_1_twi_pap_2?ie=UTF8&qid=1540569856&sr=8-1&keywords=Paul+Mero
 The Natural Family: A Manifesto
 The Natural Family: Bulwark of Liberty
 
 Removing Classrooms from the Battlefield: Liberty, Paternalism, and the Redemptive Promise of Educational Choice
 Saving Education and Ourselves: A Moral Case for Self-Reliance in Education (2002), Sutherland Institute.
 Neighbors in Need: A New Approach to Compassionate Poverty Relief (2001), Sutherland Institute.
 Exceptional Utah: Leading America in Faith, Family and Freedom (2013), Sutherland Institute.
 Preserving Sacred Ground: A Responsible Citizen's Approach to Same-Sex Politics (2009), Sutherland Institute.
 The Unhappy Young Man: A Parable (2009), Sutherland Institute.

References

External links
 The Sutherland Institute

Living people
Brigham Young University alumni
American rhetoricians
1957 births